Levente Mady (born 2 May 1959) is a Canadian former swimmer. He competed in the men's 4 × 100 metre freestyle relay at the 1984 Summer Olympics.

References

External links
 

1959 births
Living people
Canadian male freestyle swimmers
Olympic swimmers of Canada
Swimmers at the 1984 Summer Olympics
Universiade medalists in swimming
Sportspeople from Arad, Romania
Universiade silver medalists for Canada
Medalists at the 1981 Summer Universiade